The B4558 road is a road in Powys, central Wales, with a total length of . It begins at a junction with the A4077 road across the Usk bridge from Crickhowell and runs northwest up the southern side of the Usk valley to a junction with the A40 road 3.5 km east of Brecon.  En route from Crickhowell it passes through the villages of Llangynidr, Talybont-on-Usk, and Pencelli. It is closely followed over this section by the Monmouthshire and Brecon Canal which it crosses six times. River crossings include those of the Nant Cleisfer and Afon Crawnon at Llangynidr, the Caerfanell at Talybont and the Nant Menasgin between Pencelli and Llanfrynach. It crosses the Usk itself by the historic Lock Bridge just south of the village of Groesffordd, east of Brecon.

Further reading

References

Roads in Wales
Transport in Powys